Melia is a genus of flowering trees in the family Meliaceae. The name is derived from μελία, the Greek name used by Theophrastus (c. 371 – c. 287 BC) for Fraxinus ornus, which has similar leaves.

Selected species

 List sources :

Formerly placed here   
Azadirachta excelsa (Jack) M.Jacobs (as M. excelsa Jack)
Azadirachta indica A.Juss. (as M. azadirachta L.)
Cipadessa baccifera (Roth) Miq. (as M. baccifera Roth)
Dysoxylum parasiticum (Osbeck) Kosterm. (as M. parasitica Osbeck)
Sandoricum koetjape (Burm.f.) Merr. (as M. koetjape Burm.f.)

References

External links

 
Meliaceae genera